Freak-Out is the seventh album released by the Japanese metal band Aion. This is the bands "softest sounding" album, the songs are more straight hard rock, with barely any metal edge to them. For this reason it is arguably considered the bands worst, reflected by them having disbanded the year of its release. Although not disbanded in the traditional sense, as Nov and Izumi continued to release their own music using the Aion name.

Track listing

Personnel
Nov – vocals
Izumi – lead and rhythm guitars
Dean – bass
Shu – drums

References

1995 albums
Aion (Japanese band) albums